The Bowers Harbor Inn is a restaurant located at 13512 Peninsula Drive in Peninsula Township, Michigan. It was constructed in 1928 as a private house, the Stickney Summer House, and renovated into the restaurant in the late 1950s; it now houses the Mission Table and Jolly Pumpkin Restaurants. The site overlooks the waters of Bowers Harbor, an inlet of Grand Traverse Bay. It was listed on the National Register of Historic Places in 2011.

History
Charles Francis Stickney was born in 1868 in Groveland, Massachusetts, the son of Charles Stickney and Julia G. Noyes.  He married Genevive (Jennie) E. Worthen in 1891.  By 1900 the couple had moved to Chicago, where Stickney made a fortune in the steel and lumber industries. They soon began travelling to the Grand Traverse area, likely taking advantage of the Pere Marquette Railway summer trains that ran from Chicago to Petoskey, Michigan.

In 1920, the Stickneys purchased this property, then a typical Old Mission Peninsula farm with a rather large orchard.  They continued the farming use of the property and canned preserves from the orchard harvest, offering them for sale. In 1928, the Stickneys hired Jennie Stickney's nephew, Kenneth B. Worthen, to design a new summer house for their property.  Worthern was at the time a principal of Bentley-Worthen Architects in St. Paul, Minnesota, and had made a name for himself by designing many large Twin City residences, many in a distinctive storybook English Cottage style.  Worthern designed this 26-room Arts and Crafts, Storybook style house for the couple.  The house was built at a cost of $175,000, and the Stickneys dubbed it the We-Gwa-Se-Min Ranch.

Jennie Stickney died in 1947 in Grand Rapids, Michigan and Charles Stickney died two year later in Traverse City. In 1958, Jim and Fern Bryant purchased the Stickneys' property and converted the main house to a restaurant they called the "Bowers Harbor Inn."  The restaurant opened in 1959. In 1974, Howard A. Schelde and three business partners purchased the restaurant and renovated it.   In 1978, they renovated the previously abandoned east portion of the structure to become a separate casual restaurant, "The Bowery." In 2006, the property was purchased by Jon Carlson and Greg Lobdell, who again renovated the property.  They added a microbrewery, turned the Bowery restaurant into The Jolly Pumpkin Restaurant, Microbrewery & Distillery, and turned the Bowers Harbor Inn Restaurant into the Mission Table Restaurant & Tasting Room. The building continues to house the two restaurants, one for fine dining and one casual.

Description
The Stickney Summer House is a large, two story frame Storybook style structure. It consists of the main 1928 house on the west, a "carriage house" on the east (which may have been constructed earlier), and an addition which connects the two separate structures.

The front facade of the house has a central bay with a recessed entrance.  The entrance has a heavy wooden door with iron strap hinges, surrounded by glass lights.  Above the entrance is a pair of French doors opening onto a small balcony with a wrought iron railing.  To the left of the entrance bay is a projecting bay holding a two-story porch with a shallow hip roof.  To the right is a three-bay wide section with a central three-sided bay window flanked by a single tall window on each side.

The north side of the house has three small first-floor windows and none on the second floor. This section was originally an open porch, but was enclosed in the 1960s.  The south side of the house is dominated by a massive fieldstone and brick end chimney.  A pair of French doors flank the chimney on the first floor, and an oriel window protrudes from the chimney's center at the second floor level.  A concrete terrace runs across the entire front facade of the building and extends to the south side.

The rear of the house is relatively featureless, with windows only on the second floor.  An gable-roofed addition connects the house with a "carriage house" (now the Bowery Restaurant), which is a two-story hip roof structure.

The interior of the structure has an Arts and Crafts look, with dark stained wood floors and wood trim throughout the restaurant. The front door opens onto an entrance hall with a flagstone floor and a curved staircase with a wrought iron railing. Arched doorways open from there onto two dining rooms.  The south one has a polished flagstone floor, plaster walls, a wood cross beam ceiling, and a massive stone fireplace with a rustic beam mantel and flagstone hearth.  The north dining room has a brick fireplace, wood cross beam ceilings, and a wooden bar.  The upstairs contains rooms which were formerly bedrooms.

References

External links
Bowers Harbor Inn Estate

Houses on the National Register of Historic Places in Michigan
Houses in Grand Traverse County, Michigan
Houses completed in 1928
Arts and Crafts architecture in the United States
National Register of Historic Places in Grand Traverse County, Michigan
1928 establishments in Michigan